Zipf is a surname. Notable people with the surname include:

Andy Zipf, American singer-songwriter
George Kingsley Zipf (1902–1950), American linguist and philologist noted for Zipf's law
Christoph Zipf, professional tennis player from Germany
Jonathan Zipf, German triathlete

See also
Redl-Zipf